Jenő Kuti (born 18 June 1909, date of death unknown) was a Hungarian weightlifter. He competed in the men's featherweight event at the 1936 Summer Olympics.

References

External links
 

1909 births
Year of death missing
Hungarian male weightlifters
Olympic weightlifters of Hungary
Weightlifters at the 1936 Summer Olympics
Place of birth missing
20th-century Hungarian people